Johnny Saxton (July 4, 1930 – October 4, 2008) was an American professional boxer in the welterweight (147lb) division. He was born in Newark, New Jersey, learned to box in a Brooklyn orphanage and had an amateur career winning 31 of 33 fights, twice becoming World Welterweight Champion.

Professional career 
Saxton turned professional in 1949 and ran up forty wins without a defeat before losing to Gil Turner in 1953. His win over Joey Giardello and Johnny Bratton helped propel him to fight with Kid Gavilán (or Gavilan) in 1954 for the world welterweight championship. He beat Gavilan via a fifteen-round decision to take the title. He lost the title the following year via technical knockout against Tony DeMarco.  In 1956 he won the title again with an upset win over Carmen Basilio, but lost the title in a rematch with Basilio later in the year.  He retired in 1958.

Saxton, brother of Richard Eugene Kyle, who boxed for the U.S. Army, was managed by Frank "Blinky" Palermo, a member of the Philadelphia crime family. Palermo was imprisoned in 1961 for conspiracy and extortion for the covert ownership of prizefighters. Saxton's career was often marred by rumors of shady dealings. His two biggest wins, against Gavilan and Basilio, were both controversial and unpopular with many in the boxing world.

After boxing 

Saxton worked as a security guard and a boxing coach after he retired. A hit-and-run accident left him with damage to one leg, and by the early 1990s he was living in a New York City apartment that had no electricity. A friend helped Saxton move to a retirement home in Florida. He was diagnosed with pugilistic dementia.

Professional boxing record

See also
List of welterweight boxing champions

References

External links 

 https://boxrec.com/media/index.php/National_Boxing_Association%27s_Quarterly_Ratings:_1954
 https://boxrec.com/media/index.php/National_Boxing_Association%27s_Quarterly_Ratings:_1955
 https://boxrec.com/media/index.php/National_Boxing_Association%27s_Quarterly_Ratings:_1956
 https://web.archive.org/web/20121009110002/http://boxrec.com/list_bouts.php?human_id=9703&cat=boxer
 https://web.archive.org/web/20090303141303/http://www.boxinginsider.com/history/strange-days/

1930 births
2008 deaths
Welterweight boxers
World welterweight boxing champions
World boxing champions
American male boxers